Alibay Samadov (Əlibəy Səmədov, born  in Respublika Dagestan) is a Russian born Azerbaijani male weightlifter, competing in the 105 kg category and representing Azerbaijan at international competitions. He participated at the 2004 Summer Olympics in the 94 kg event. He competed at world championships, most recently at the 2010 World Weightlifting Championships.

Major results

References

External links
 

1982 births
Living people
Azerbaijani male weightlifters
Weightlifters at the 2004 Summer Olympics
Olympic weightlifters of Azerbaijan
People from Dagestan
Place of birth unknown